The Delta Princess Stakes was an American Thoroughbred horse race run annually at Delta Downs in Vinton, Louisiana. A Grade III event for the first time in 2008, it is raced in November. It is open to two-year-old fillies. It is contested in November over a distance of 1 mile (8 Furlongs) on dirt.

The race is held on the same day as the Delta Downs Jackpot Stakes for two-year-old males.

The 2005 edition of the Delta Princess Stakes was cancelled due to Hurricane Katrina. The 2017 edition was cancelled in the aftermath of Hurricane Harvey.

The event was last run in 2016.

Records
Speed record:
 1:37.98 - Shane's Girlfriend (2016)

Most wins by a jockey:
 2 - Paco Lopez (2012, 2014)
 2 - Shaun Bridgmohan (2008, 2010)

Most wins by a trainer:
 2 - Steve Asmussen (2004, 2008)

Most wins by an owner:
 No owner has won this race more than once.

Winners

See also
Road to the Kentucky Oaks

References

Delta Downs official site
The Delta Princess Stakes at Pedigree Query

2002 establishments in Louisiana
Horse races in Louisiana
Delta Downs
Flat horse races for two-year-old fillies
Graded stakes races in the United States
Tourist attractions in Calcasieu Parish, Louisiana
Recurring sporting events disestablished in 2016
2016 disestablishments in Louisiana